S360 may refer to :
 Honda S360, a 1962 sports car
 Sendo S360, a Sendo mobile phone model
 Sony CLIÉ PEG-S360, a Sony CLIÉ PDA model
 a Waves Audio processor
 Studio S360, a Radford Electronics loudspeaker model

S/360 may refer to :
 IBM System/360, a 1964 mainframe computer system family